Testimony is the third studio album, and the first concept album, by Neal Morse. Released in 2003, this double record is in five sections detailing the composer's life and conversion to Christianity. The album features performances from then-Dream Theater drummer Mike Portnoy and Kerry Livgren of Kansas, although the majority of instruments are played by Morse himself.

Footage from the writing and recording sessions for this album was released as a two-hour-long DVD titled Making of Testimony: Rough Edit in September 2007.

The story was also expanded upon and released in book form in 2011 titled, Testimony.

Track listing
All songs written and composed by Neal Morse.

Disc One

Disc Two

Disc Three (Limited Edition)

Personnel

 Neal Morse - producer, composer, guitars, bass guitar, synth, piano, organ, vocals
 Mike Portnoy - drums
 Kerry Livgren - guitar solo on "Long Story"
 Eric Brenton - violin, flute
 Chris Carmichael - violin, cello, strings
 David Henry - Cello
 Jim Hoke - Sax
 Neil Rosengarden - Trumpet
 Katie Hagen - French horn
 Mark Leniger - Saxophone, Soloist
 Byron House - string bass
 Glenn Caruba - percussion
 Johnny Cox - Pedal steel guitar
 Jerry Guidroz - Engineer, Handclapping, Sampling
 Pamela Ward, Aaron Marshall, Rick Altizer, Terry White, Gene Miller - backing vocals
 Rich Mouser - Mixing

Release details
2003, UK, Inside Out Music/Spv 6-93723-60412-1, Release Date 22 September 2003, CD
2003, UK, Inside Out Music/Spv 6-93723-00502-7, Release Date 29 September 2003, CD (Special Edition 3-CD set)
2003, USA, Radiant Records I491302, Release Date 22 September 2003, CD

References

Neal Morse albums
2003 albums
Concept albums